Peter O'Keefe (born 24 March 1956) is a former Australian rules footballer who played with Melbourne in the Victorian Football League (VFL).

Notes

External links 

1956 births
Living people
Australian rules footballers from Victoria (Australia)
Melbourne Football Club players
Seymour Football Club players